Rosa Törmänen (born 6 August 1992) is a Finnish racing cyclist. She finished in second place in the Finnish National Road Race Championships in 2012.

References

External links

1992 births
Living people
Finnish female cyclists
Place of birth missing (living people)